Peter Eggenschwiler is a Swiss curler.

At the national level, he is a 1995 Swiss men's champion curler.

Teams

References

External links

Living people
Swiss male curlers

Year of birth missing (living people)